Sà Phìn is a commune of Đồng Văn District, Hà Giang Province, Vietnam.

It has 2264 inhabitants, most of whom are Hmong.

Sà Phìn was the site of the residence of the Hmong kings of Hà Giang Province.

References

Populated places in Hà Giang province